Left for Linguistic Tolerance (in Spanish: Izquierda por la Tolerancia Lingüística), a political party in Catalonia, Spain, founded in 1993. Initially known as Izquierda Solidaria. ITL works for the rights of the non-Catalan-speaking population and favour bilingualism. It used the 'Ñ' as its symbol.

ITL is led by Félix Pérez Romera.

In 1994 ITL signed a 'Manifest for Linguistic Tolerance in Catalonia'.

ITL have never obtained political representation in any election.

Political parties in Catalonia